Fremantle by-election may refer to:

 1945 Fremantle by-election
 1990 Fremantle state by-election
 1994 Fremantle by-election
 2009 Fremantle state by-election
 2018 Fremantle by-election